Baktalórántháza VSE is a Hungarian football club located in Baktalórántháza, Hungary. It currently plays in Hungarian National Championship II. The team's colors are white and blue.

Football clubs in Hungary
Association football clubs established in 1916
1916 establishments in Hungary